Devotion or Devotions may refer to:

Religion
 Faith, confidence or trust in a person, thing, or concept
 Anglican devotions, private prayers and practices used by Anglican Christians
 Buddhist devotion, commitment to religious observance
 Catholic devotions, customs, rituals, and practices of worship of God or honour of the saints 
 Marian devotions, directed to Mary, mother of God
 Bible study (Christianity)
 Knightly Piety devotion 
 Hindu devotional movements

Arts and entertainment

Film and television
 Devotion (1921 film), an American silent film
 Devotion (1929 film), an Austrian-German silent drama
 Devotion (1931 film), an American drama
 Devotion (1946 film), an American biographical film
 Devotion (1950 film), an Italian film
 Devotion (1954 film), a Soviet film
 Devotion (2022 film), an American biographical war drama film
 Devotion (TV series), a Singaporean TV series
 "Devotion" (Charlie Jade), an episode of the TV series

Gaming
 Devotion (video game), 2019

Literature 
 Devotion (novella), by Botho Strauß, 1977
 Devotion, a 2017 book by Patti Smith
 Devotion: An Epic Story of Heroism, Friendship, and Sacrifice, a 2015 biography of Thomas J. Hudner Jr. and Jesse L. Brown

Music
The Devotions, a 1960s music group

Albums and EPs

 Devotion (Anberlin album), 2013
 Devotion (Baby V.O.X album), 2003
 Devotion (Beach House album), 2008
 Devotion (Jessie Ware album), 2012
 Devotion (John McLaughlin album), 1970
 Devotion (Kap Bambino album), 2012
 Devotion (L.T.D. album), 1979
 Devotion (Margaret Glaspy album), 2020
 Devotion (Masami Okui album), 2001
 Devotion (Mia Martina album), 2011
 Devotion (Newsboys album), 2004
 Devotion (Tirzah album), 2018
 Devotion (EP), by At War With False Noise, 2008
 Devotion, an EP by Shizuka Itō, 2010
 Devotion: The Best of Yanni, 1997

Songs
 "Devotion" (song), by Earth, Wind & Fire, 1974
 "Devotion", a song by Coleman Hell from the 2016 album Summerland
 "Devotion", a song by Ellie Goulding from the 2015 album Delirium
 "Devotion", a song by Hurts featuring Kylie Minogue from the 2010 album Happiness
 "Devotion", a song by Luscious Jackson from the 1999 album Electric Honey 
 "Devotion", a song by Rüfüs Du Sol from the 2021 album Surrender
 "(I Wanna Give You) Devotion", by Nomad, 1990

Places 
 Devotion, North Carolina, U.S.

See also 

 Devotional (disambiguation)
 Devotion + Doubt, a 1997 album by Richard Buckner
 Bhakti, devotion in Hinduism
 Pietas, devotion among the ancient Romans
 Knightly Piety, Christian belief espoused by knights during the Middle Ages